The pacarana (Dinomys branickii) is a rare and slow-moving hystricognath rodent indigenous to South America. Native Tupi people call it the pacarana (false paca) because it is superficially similar to the paca, a different rodent which is not in the same family.

The pacarana is nocturnal and is found only in tropical forests of the western Amazon River basin and adjacent foothills of the Andes Mountains. It ranges from northwestern Venezuela and Colombia to western Bolivia, including the Yungas. It is common in Cotapata National Park in Bolivia.

The pacarana is the sole extant member of the rodent family Dinomyidae in the infraorder Caviomorpha; the paca that it resembles in appearance is in a different Caviomorph family, the Cuniculidae. Initially, the pacarana was regarded as a member of the superfamily Muroidea, that includes the true mice, but that view was abandoned in the face of evidence that suggests that the pacarana is in the family Dinomyidae together with extinct animals such as Phoberomys pattersoni and Josephoartigasia monesi, prehistoric giant rodents that lived in South America several million years ago.

Pacaranas typically are found in family groups of four or five.

Characteristics 
Pacarana have 4 limbs and large heads. They are considered a scansorial species. When they eat, they grasp their food with their fore-paws while sitting on their hind legs.

References

External links 

 
 
 
 

Hystricognath rodents
Mammals of the Andes
Rodents of South America
Mammals of Bolivia
Mammals of Brazil
Mammals of Colombia
Mammals of Ecuador
Mammals of Peru
Mammals of Venezuela
Vulnerable animals
Vulnerable biota of South America
Mammals described in 1873
Taxa named by Wilhelm Peters